= Nipaniya Sukha =

- village
- Location within Madhya Pradesh Location within India
- Coordinates: 23.3895436°N 77.3238274°E
- Country: India
- State: Madhya Pradesh
- District: Bhopal
- Tehsil: Huzur
- Elevation: 517 m (1,696 ft)

Population (2011)
  - Total: 709
- Time zone: UTC+5:30 (IST)
- ISO 3166 code: MP-IN
- 2011 census code: 482376

Nipaniya Sukha is a village in the Bhopal district of Madhya Pradesh, India. It is located in the Huzur tehsil and the Phanda block.

== Demographics ==
According to the 2011 census of India, Nipaniya Sukha has 157 households. The effective literacy rate (i.e. the literacy rate of population excluding children aged 6 and below) is 64.14%.

Demographics (2011 Census)
	Total	Male	Female
Population	709	382	327
Children aged below 6 years	101	45	56
Scheduled caste	457	238	219
Scheduled tribe	10	6	4
Literates	390	248	142
Workers (all)	366	218	148
Main workers (total)	306	177	129
Main workers: Cultivators	118	66	52
Main workers: Agricultural labourers	179	108	71
Main workers: Household industry workers	5	3	2
Main workers: Other	4	0	4
Marginal workers (total)	60	41	19
Marginal workers: Cultivators	10	6	4
Marginal workers: Agricultural labourers	45	32	13
Marginal workers: Household industry workers	3	2	1
Marginal workers: Others	2	1	1
Non-workers	343	164	179
